Dzimtmisa Manor is a manor in Dzimtmisa, Iecava Municipality in the historical region of Zemgale, in Latvia.

History 
Estate known as Misa manor was built in 1560, it first owner was Lukas Wolf. Manor was located in the very center of Puttelene, now between Iecava and Baldoni, 35 km from Riga-Bauska highway. Later Manor was renamed Dzimtmisa Manor. 
Later Manor belonged to Johann Treider. The last owner of the manor was Edmund von Reichard and his wife. The manor house was built in the 19th century, then rebuilt several times. Structurally manor is a log house with plank cladding.

See also
List of palaces and manor houses in Latvia

References

Manor houses in Latvia